Frédéric Assogba Affo (1943—2011) was a Beninese politician. He was the foreign minister of Benin from 1984 to 1987.

Born in Ouedeme, Affo enjoyed an international education. He was a participant in the coup of 1972 and became one of its most prominent voices. Several years later, he joined the central committee of the Parti de la Revolution Populare du Benin. He served as foreign minister and ambassador to Cuba. After presiding over his local football team, The Atlantic Sharks, Affo became the president of the entire Atlantique Football League. His dedication resulted in his becoming the head of the Benin Football Association. Affo died on 3 May 2011 in Cotonou.

Notes

References

1943 births
Foreign ministers of Benin
2011 deaths
People from Collines Department
Ambassadors of Benin to Cuba
20th-century Beninese politicians
20th-century diplomats